James Kelly Basin is a bay inside Port Davey in South West Tasmania, in the Southwest National Park.  It lies below Davey Head (346m), and opens into Payne Bay, a northern arm of Port Davey that is west of Bathurst Harbour.  It was named after James Kelly, an early explorer of the Tasmanian coastline.

A similar named feature in Macquarie Harbour to the north on the West Coast, and not to be confused is called Kelly Basin.

References

Bays of Tasmania
South West Tasmania